Epsilon Andromedae, Latinized from ε Andromedae, is a star in the constellation of Andromeda. It can be seen with the naked eye, having an apparent visual magnitude of 4.4. Based upon an annual parallax shift of 21.04 mas as seen from Earth, it is located 155 light years from the Sun. The system is moving closer to the Sun with a radial velocity of −84 km/s. Its orbit in the Milky Way is highly eccentric, causing it to move rapidly relative to the Sun and its neighboring stars.

Properties
The suffix notation indicates there is a strong underabundance of iron in the spectrum, and an overabundance of cyanogen (CN). ε Andromedae is believed to be a red clump star which is fusing helium in its core. It has about the same mass as the Sun, but has expanded to nine times the Sun's radius. The star is radiating 51 times the Sun's luminosity from its enlarged photosphere at an effective temperature of 5,082 K.

Naming

References

External links
 Image Epsilon Andromedae

G-type giants
Horizontal-branch stars
Andromeda (constellation)
Andromedae, Epsilon
BD+28 0103
Andromedae, 30
003546
003031
0163
TIC objects